Baygazino (Bayğaźı) is a rural locality (a village) and the administrative centre of Baygazinsky Selsoviet, Burzyansky District, Bashkortostan, Russia. The population was 360 as of 2010. There are 6 streets.

Geography 
Baygazino is located 30 km northeast of Starosubkhangulovo (the district's administrative centre) by road. Novousmanovo is the nearest rural locality.

References 

Rural localities in Burzyansky District